Buller is an English surname. It may refer to:

People
 Anthony Buller (1613–1679), English soldier and Member of Parliament
 Sir Anthony Buller (1780–1866), English lawyer and Member of Parliament
 Arthur Henry Reginald Buller (1874–1944), British/Canadian mycologist
 Charles Buller (1806–1848), English politician
 David Buller (born 1959), American philosopher of science
 Sir Edward Buller, 1st Baronet (1764–1824)
 Ed Buller, British musician
 Eric Buller (1894–1973), cricketer and British army officer
 Francesca Buller (b. 1964), British actress
 Francis Buller (Parliamentarian) English politician
 Francis Buller (c 1630–1682), English politician
 Sir Francis Buller, 1st Baronet (1746–1800)
 Fred Buller (1914–1994), Canadian aeronautical engineer, sailboat designer
 George Buller (MP) (1607–c. 1646), English politician
 Sir George Buller (1802–1884), British Army General
 Georgiana Buller (1884–1953), British hospital administrator
 Hy Buller (1926–1968), Canadian ice hockey player
 James Buller (the younger) (c. 1729–1765), British politician
 James Wentworth Buller (1798–1865), British politician
 Joe Buller (1909–1986), English footballer
 John Buller MP (1632–1716), English politician
 John Buller (1721–1786), British MP for East Looe
 John Buller (1745–1793), MP for Exeter, Launceston, and West Looe
 John Buller (composer) (1927–2004), British composer
 Jon Buller (born 1970), Canadian musician
 Marion Buller, Canadian judge
 Redvers Buller (1839–1908), British soldier
 Sir Richard Buller (1578–1642), Parliamentarian
 Syd Buller (1909–1970), English Test cricket umpire
 Walter Buller (1838–1906), New Zealand ornithologist
 Lt. Col. Walter Buller (bridge) (1887–1938), British bridge player
 William Buller (bishop), theologian and churchman
 William Buller (racing driver) (born 1992), British racing driver

Places
Australia
 Mount Buller (Victoria)
 Mount Buller, Victoria, a resort town on the mountain of the same name
New Zealand
 Buller (New Zealand electorate)
 Buller District
 Buller Gorge
 Buller River

Other uses
 Buller, nickname of the Bullingdon Club, a student dining club at Oxford University

See also

Buller baronets, a British title
Sir James Buller East, 2nd Baronet (1798–1878), British MP for Winchester
Baron Churston
Eliza Manningham-Buller
Viscount Dilhorne
John Yarde-Buller, 1st Baron Churston

Surnames of English origin
Russian Mennonite surnames